The 2008 Autosport 1000 km of Silverstone was the fifth and final race of the 2008 Le Mans Series season.  It took place at the Silverstone Circuit, Great Britain, on 14 September 2008. The race was attended by a record crowd of 53,000 spectators.

Although Audi scored their first and only win of the season, an accident involving the then championship-leading Peugeots allowed Audi to win the Teams, Constructors, and Drivers Championships in the LMP1 category.  Luc Alphand's team won the GT1 championship by merely finishing the event, and Virgo Motorsports and driver Rob Bell secured their second consecutive GT2 championship with a class victory.

This was the first time in Le Mans Series history that none of the Peugeot 908s finished in the podium spots as well as in the top eight points positions (#8 finished 19th overall and 11th in LMP1; #7 did not finish at 44th overall and 15th (last) in class), which helped Audi to take the championship. The only other time that the Peugeot 908 did not finish in the podium was in the 12 Hours of Sebring earlier this year, when the lone 908 finished 11th overall and almost finished in the podium at 4th behind the two Audis and an Intersport Lola-AER.

Race results
Class winners in bold.  Cars failing to complete 70% of winner's distance marked as Not Classified (NC).

Statistics
 Pole Position - #8 Team Peugeot Total - 1:30.359
 Fastest Lap - #8 Team Peugeot Total - 1:31.166
 Average Speed -

References

External links

 Le Mans Series - Silverstone

Silverstone
6 Hours of Silverstone
Silverstone